Gregorio Billikopf (born September 23, 1954 in Santiago, Chile) is a mediator, author, and since 1981, a farm advisor specializing in labor management for the University of California, Davis. In May 2005, Billikopf accepted a visiting faculty appointment as an honorary professor of agricultural labor management at the University of Chile in Santiago. Billikopf is a frequent national and international speaker (including United States, as well as in Russia, México, Canada, Uganda, Colombia, Argentina, Spain, Japan, New Zealand and his native Chile) in his field.

His agricultural extension research and teaching efforts have focused on such topics as employee selection, compensation, performance appraisal, discipline and termination, supervision, interpersonal relations, conflict resolution, and interpersonal negotiation skills. Billikopf is the recipient of the 1989 National Association for County Agricultural Agents (NACAA) Achievement Award and the 2006 Distinguished Service Award. He has received a number of other awards from NACAA, including two National Winner communication awards: Webpage in 1999 (Agricultural Labor Management); and Publication in 2006 (for his book Labor Management in Agriculture: Cultivating Personnel Productivity, 2nd Edition, 2003).

Billikopf's maternal family have been grape growers in Chile for generations. It is at the labor-intensive family vineyard, where Gregorio spent much of his youth, that he first developed an interest in labor issues, horses and agriculture. While doing a search in the internet, Billikopf found that this interest in conflict management also runs in the family. His paternal grandfather, Jacob Billikopf, is listed as a "notable arbitrator" whose writings are included in the Cornell University School of Industrial Relations' Kheel Center for Labor-Management Documentation and Archive and elsewhere. On his Chilean side, he is related to historian Francisco Antonio Encina, author of Historia de Chile.

Billikopf has authored numerous articles published in academic journals, several books including Labor Management in Agriculture (1994, 2003) and Party Directed Mediation: Facilitating Dialogue Between Individuals (3rd Edition, 2014), and portrays practical examples of Party-directed mediation an emerging specialty within the field of alternative dispute resolution. He presented his two mediation models, Party-directed mediation (PDM) and Negotiated Performance Appraisal (NPA), for dealing with peer to peer conflict and supervisor-subordinate conflict, respectively, at the International Association for Conflict Management [IACM] annual meetings in 2005 (Seville, Spain) and 2009 (Kyoto, Japan).

Raised in Chile's Central Valley, Billikopf went on to obtain his Bachelor of Science in plant science from UC Davis, and his Master of Arts in labor management from California State University, Stanislaus. Since his retirement from the University of California, Billikopf and his wife reside in Llanquihue, Chile, in what is called the Lake Region, and are the parents of four children and a growing number of grandchildren. Special interests include activities as a dressage (equestrian sports) instructor, amateur radio operator, a soccer referee and a student of the Hebrew Holy Scriptures, especially Isaiah and the latter prophets (NEVI'M). On his Jewish side, Gregorio is the grandson of Jacob Billikopf (involved in social work, Jewish philanthropy and labor arbitration) and great-grandson of Louis Marshall (corporate, constitutional and civil rights lawyer as well as a mediator and Jewish community leader). On his Chilean side, Gregorio is related to Francisco Antonio Encina, author of the 20 volume Historia de Chile. In March 1974, after reading the Book of Mormon, Billikopf became a member of the Church of Jesus Christ of Latter-day Saints.

See also 

 Party-directed mediation

References

External links 
 Party-Directed Mediation: Facilitating Dialogue Between Individuals by Gregorio Billikopf, free complete book PDF download, at the University of California (3rd Edition, posted 17 April 2014)
 Party-Directed Mediation: Facilitating Dialogue Between Individuals by Gregorio Billikopf, free complete book PDF download from Archive.org - various formats (3rd Edition, posted 17 April 2014)
 Interpersonal Negotiation Skills two-hour seminar by Gregorio Billikopf, 2013, guest speaker at California State University, Stanislaus, a summary of Chapter 4 of Party-Directed Mediation.
 Empathic Listening Audio by Gregorio Billikopf, download hour lecture on MP3 files (15 files in zip folder), at the University of California (2009, Chapter 2 of Party-Directed Mediation).
 Gregorio Billikopf, El Huasito - Revista Agricola - Osorno, Chile Biographical article (2014) published by Revista Agricola, Diario Austral, in Chile after his return to Chile (IN SPANISH).
 UC Berkeley.edu – Gregorio "Uncle Moo" Billikopf

1954 births
California State University, Stanislaus alumni
Chilean male writers
Living people
Agricultural writers
University of California, Davis alumni